Laura Glading is a labor union activist and leader. She was elected president of the Association of Professional Flight Attendants (APFA), the independent union that represents flight attendants at American Airlines, in February 2008. Glading was elected to a second term in February 2012. She is currently the executive director of labor and employee relations for the Federal Aviation Administration (FAA).

Career
Glading began her career as a flight attendant with American Airlines in the late 1970s, quickly becoming an active member of the Association of Professional Flight Attendants. She became a base president for the APFA in New York prior to the 1993 American Airlines flight attendant strike. Later, she served as committee chair for the APFA's negotiation committee before being elected national president of the APFA in 2008.

During her nearly eight-year tenure as president, Glading oversaw the union through American Airline's bankruptcy and advocated for the historic American Airlines–US Airways merger. Along with union leaders David Bates of the Allied Pilots Association and James Little of the Transport Workers Union, Glading reached an agreement with US Airways management to back merger efforts. In September 2013, Glading met with top antitrust officials at the U.S. Justice Department to urge their approval of the planned merger, which they had initially opposed. The meeting followed a pro-merger rally outside the U.S. Capitol led by workers from both airlines. Glading later credited the merger with saving 5,000 flight attendant jobs and leading to pay raises of 13% to 16%.  

In November 2014, a new contract that Glading negotiated in the wake of the merger was voted down by a small margin due to some members' discontent with its omission of profit-sharing. The next month, the airline announced an arbitrated contract that fell short of the November proposal by $81 million. Glading and the APFA negotiating committee subsequently met with American Airlines management and succeeded in increasing the value of the contract, securing a raise for union flight attendants. 

Glading has spoken publicly on a number of issues relating to flight attendant safety and security, including a submission to the United States House Homeland Security Subcommittee on Transportation Security in April 2013 in which she opposed a Transportation Security Administration (TSA) initiative to permit small knives on planes. The TSA reversed its decision to allow knives on planes in June 2013.

On October 3, 2015, Glading sent a letter to the membership of APFA stating that she would resign as APFA National President on December 2, 2015. On October 5, 2015, following a meeting with the APFA Board of Directors, Glading announced that she would step down on October 9, 2015. 

In 2016, Glading was hired by the Federal Aviation Administration's human resource management department in Washington D.C. as executive director of labor and employee relations.

References

American trade union leaders
Living people
Year of birth missing (living people)